Daquq District is a district in eastern Kirkuk Governorate, northern Iraq. Its administrative center is the city of Daquq. The district has a Shia Turkmen majority.

References 

Districts of Kirkuk Province